This article serves as an index - as complete as possible - of all the honorific orders or similar decorations received by the Spanish royal family, classified by continent, awarding country and recipient.

Spanish honours 

 Felipe VI of Spain :
 Sovereign (19 June 2014) and Knight (3 May 1981) of the Order of the Golden Fleece (1,182nd Knight)
 Grand Master (19 June 2014) and Knight of the Collar (24 January 1986) of the Royal and Distinguished Order of Charles III
 Grand Master (19 June 2014) and Knight Grand Cross (7 July 1986) of the Order of Military Merit, with white distinctive
 Grand Master (19 June 2014) and Knight Grand Cross (13 July 1987) of the Order of Naval Merit, with white distinctive
 Grand Master (19 June 2014) and Knight Grand Cross (4 July 1988) of the Order of Aeronautical Merit, with white distinctive
 Grand Master (19 June 2014) and Knight Grand Cross (30 April 1999) of the Royal and Military Order of Saint Hermenegild
 Grand Master of the Royal Order of Isabel the Catholic (Spain, 19 June 2014)
 Grand Master of the Royal and Military Order of Saint Ferdinand (Spain, 19 June 2014)
 Grand Master of the Order of Montesa (Spain, 19 June 2014)
 Grand Master of the Order of Alcántara (Spain, 19 June 2014)
 Grand Master of the Order of Calatrava (Spain, 19 June 2014)
 Grand Master of the Order of Santiago (Spain, 19 June 2014)
 Queen Letizia of Spain : 
 Dame Grand Cross of the Royal and Distinguished Order of Charles III (on 21 May 2004)
 Juan Carlos I of Spain (retired) :
 Sovereign of the Order of the Golden Fleece (Spain)
 Grand Master of the Royal and Distinguished Order of Charles III (Spain)
 Grand Master of the Royal Order of Isabel the Catholic (Spain)
 Grand Master of the Royal and Military Order of Saint Hermenegild (Spain)
 Grand Master of the Royal and Military Order of Saint Ferdinand (Spain)
 Grand Master of the Order of Montesa (Spain)
 Grand Master of the Order of Alcántara (Spain)
 Grand Master of the Order of Calatrava (Spain)
 Grand Master of the Order of Santiago (Spain)
 Knight of the Order of St. Xavier (Spain)
 Queen Sofía of Spain (retired) :
 Dame Grand Cross of the Royal and Distinguished Order of Charles III (on 10 May 1962) 
 Dame of the Royal Order of Queen Maria Luisa (1,193rd lady on 14 May 1962)
 Dame Grand Collar of the Royal and Distinguished Order of Charles III (on 31 October 1983)
 Leonor, Princess of Asturias
 Dame of the Order of the Golden Fleece (30 October 2015)
 Infanta Elena, Duchess of Lugo 
 Dame Grand Cross of the Royal Order of Isabella the Catholic (on 4 October 1982)
 Dame Grand Cross of the Royal and Distinguished Order of Charles III (on 31 October 1983)
 Infanta Cristina : 
 Dame Grand Cross of the Royal Order of Isabella the Catholic (on 13 June 1983)
 Dame Grand Cross of the Royal and Distinguished Order of Charles III (on 31 October 1983)
 Iñaki Urdangarin : Knight Grand Cross of the Spanish Royal Order of Sports Merit (Real Orden del Mérito Deportivo) (on 30 November 2001)
 Infanta Margarita, Duchess of Soria and Hernani :
 1,192nd Dame of the Royal Order of Queen Maria Luisa (on 6 March 1957)
 Dame Grand Cross of the Royal and Distinguished Order of Charles III (on 14 October 1988)
 Dame Grand Cross of the Civil Order of Alfonso X, the Wise (on 25 April 2003)
 Carlos Zurita, Duke of Soria and Hernani : Knight Grand Cross of the Civil Order of Alfonso X, the Wise (on 25 April 2003)

European foreign honours

Austria 

 Felipe VI of Spain : Grand Decoration of Honour in Gold with Sash for Services to the Republic of Austria (2 June 1997) 
 Juan Carlos I of Spain : Grand Star of the Decoration of Honour for Services to the Republic of Austria (31 January 1978) 
 Queen Sofía of Spain : Grand Star of the Decoration of Honour for Services to the Republic of Austria (31 January 1978) 
 Infanta Elena, Duchess of Lugo : Grand Decoration of Honour in Gold with Sash for Services to the Republic of Austria (2 June 1997) 
 Infanta Cristina : Grand Decoration of Honour in Gold with Sash for Services to the Republic of Austria (2 June 1997) 
 Jaime de Marichalar : Grand Decoration of Honour in Gold with Sash for Services to the Republic of Austria (2 June 1997)

Belgium 

 Felipe VI of Spain : Grand Cordon of the Order of Leopold (19 September 1994)
 Juan Carlos I of Spain : Grand Cordon of the Order of Leopold (26 September 1978)
 Queen Sofía of Spain : Grand Cordon of the Order of Leopold (26 September 1978)
 Infanta Elena, Duchess of Lugo : Grand Cordon of the Order of Leopold (19 September 1994)
 Infanta Cristina : Grand Cordon of the Order of Leopold (19 September 1994)

Bulgaria

Czech Republic 
 Juan Carlos I of Spain : Collar of the Order of the White Lion

Denmark 
 Juan Carlos I of Spain : Knight of Order of the Elephant (17 March 1980)
 Queen Sofía of Spain : Knight of the Order of the Elephant (17 March 1980)

Estonia 
 Felipe VI of Spain : Member 1st Class of the Order of the Cross of Terra Mariana (9 July 2007)
 Queen Letizia of Spain : Member 1st Class of the Order of the Cross of Terra Mariana (9 July 2007)
 Juan Carlos I of Spain : Collar of the Order of the Cross of Terra Mariana (9 July 2007)
 Queen Sofía of Spain : Member 1st Class of the Order of the Cross of Terra Mariana (9 July 2007)

Finland 

 Juan Carlos I of Spain : Commander Grand Cross with Collar of the Order of the White Rose of Finland (4 June 1975)
 Queen Sofía of Spain : Commander Grand Cross with Collar of the Order of the White Rose of Finland (1978)

France 

 Felipe VI of Spain : Grand Cross of the Legion of Honour 
 Queen Letizia of Spain : Grand Cross of the National Order of Merit (27 April 2009)
 Juan Carlos I of Spain :
 Grand Cross of the Legion of Honour (28 June 1978)
 Grand Cross of the National Order of Merit (1977)
 Queen Sofía of Spain : 
 Grand Cross of the Legion of Honour (28 June 1978)
 Grand Cross of the National Order of Merit (1977)

Germany 

 Felipe VI of Spain : Grand Cross 1st Class of the Order of Merit of the Federal Republic of Germany (11 November 2002)
 Grand Cross Special Class of the Order of Merit of the Federal Republic of Germany (17 October 2022)
 Queen Letizia of Spain : Grand Cross Special Class of the Order of Merit of the Federal Republic of Germany (17 October 2022)
 Juan Carlos I of Spain : Grand Cross Special Class of the Order of Merit of the Federal Republic of Germany (19 April 1977)
 Queen Sofía of Spain : Grand Cross Special Class of the Order of Merit of the Federal Republic of Germany (19 April 1977)
 Infanta Cristina of Spain : Grand Cross 1st Class of the Order of Merit of the Federal Republic of Germany (11 November 2002)
 Iñaki Urdangarin : Grand Cross 1st Class of the Order of Merit of the Federal Republic of Germany (11 November 2002)

Greece 

 Felipe VI of Spain : Grand Cross of the Order of the Redeemer (25 September 2001)
 Juan Carlos I of Spain : Grand Cross of the Order of the Redeemer (13 May 1962)
  : Knight Gran Cross with Collar of the Order of Saints George and Constantine
 Recipient of the Commemorative Badge of the Centenary of the Royal House of Greece
 Queen Sofía of Spain (born Princess of Greece) :
  : Grand Cross of the Order of the Redeemer
  : Grand Cross of the Order of St. Olga and St. Sophia
 Recipient of the Commemorative Badge of the Centenary of the Royal House of Greece
 Infanta Elena, Duchess of Lugo : Grand Cross of the Order of Honour (25 September 2001)
 Infanta Cristina : Grand Cross of the Order of Honour (25 September 2001)
 Infanta Margarita, Duchess of Soria and Hernani: 
  : Grand Cross of the Order of St. Olga and St. Sophia

Holy See 

 Felipe VI of Spain : Knight of the Collar of the Order of the Holy Sepulchre (2022)
 King Juan Carlos I of Spain : Knight of the Collar of the Order of the Holy Sepulchre
 Collar of the Order of Pope Pius IX
 Queen Sofía of Spain : 
 Dame of the Collar of Equestrian Order of the Holy Sepulchre in Jerusalem
 Pro Ecclesia et Pontifice

Hungary 

 Felipe VI of Spain : Grand Cross of the Order of Merit of the Republic of Hungary, Civilian Class (31 January 2005)
 Queen Letizia of Spain : Grand Cross of the Order of Merit of the Republic of Hungary, Civilian Class (31 January 2005)
 Juan Carlos I of Spain : Grand Cross with Chain the Order of Merit of the Republic of Hungary, Civilian Class (31 January 2005)
 Queen Sofia of Spain : Grand Cross of the Order of Merit of the Republic of Hungary, Civilian Class (31 January 2005)

Iceland 
 Juan Carlos I of Spain : Grand Cross with Collar of the Order of the Falcon (16 September 1985) 
 Queen Sofía of Spain : Grand Cross of the Order of the Falcon (16 September 1985) 
 Infanta Elena, Duchess of Lugo : Grand Cross of the Order of the Falcon (16 September 1985) 
 Infanta Cristina : Grand Cross of the Order of the Falcon (16 September 1985)

Italy 
 Felipe VI of Spain : Knight Grand Cross of the Order of Merit of the Italian Republic (27/06/1996)
 Knight Grand Cross with Collar of the Order of Merit of the Italian Republic (25/10/2021)
 Queen Letizia of Spain : Knight Grand Cross of the Order of Merit of the Italian Republic (25/10/2021)
 Juan Carlos I of Spain : Knight Grand Cross with Collar of the Order of Merit of the Italian Republic (26/05/1980)
 Queen Sofía of Spain : Knight Grand Cross of the Order of Merit of the Italian Republic (27/06/1996)
 Infanta Elena, Duchess of Lugo : Knight Grand Cross of the Order of Merit of the Italian Republic (27/06/1996)

Latvia 
 Felipe VI of Spain : Commander Grand Cross of the Order of the Three Stars, 1st Class (16 October 2004)
 Queen Letizia of Spain : Commander Grand Cross of the Order of the Three Stars, 1st Class (16 October 2004)
 Juan Carlos I of Spain : Commander Grand Cross with Chain of the Order of Three Stars (16 October 2004)
 Queen Sofía of Spain : Commander Grand Cross with Chain of the Order of Three Stars (16 October 2004)

Lithuania 
 Juan Carlos I of Spain : Grand Cross with Golden Chain of the Order of Vytautas the Great
 Queen Sofía of Spain : Grand Cross of the Order of Vytautas the Great

Luxembourg 
 Felipe VI of Spain : Grand Cross of the Order of Adolphe of Nassau (7 May 2001)
 Juan Carlos I of Spain : Knight of the Order of the Gold Lion of the House of Nassau (9 July 1980)
 Queen Sofía of Spain : Lady of the Order of the Gold Lion of the House of Nassau (9 July 1980)
 Infanta Elena, Duchess of Lugo : Grand Cross of the Order of Adolphe of Nassau (7 May 2001)
 Jaime de Marichalar : Grand Cross of the Order of the Oak Crown (7 May 2001)
 Infanta Cristina : Grand Cross of the Order of Adolphe of Nassau (7 May 2001)
 Iñaki Urdangarin : Grand Cross of the Order of the Oak Crown (7 May 2001)

Malta 
 Juan Carlos I of Spain : Honorary Companion of Honour with Collar of the National Order of Merit (25 November 2009)
 Queen Sofía of Spain : Honorary Member of the Xirka Ġieħ ir-Repubblika (25 November 2009)

Netherlands 

 Felipe VI of Spain : Grand Cross of the Order of Orange-Nassau (8 October 1985)
 Queen Letizia of Spain : Grand Cross of the Order of the Crown (15 October 2014)
 Juan Carlos I of Spain : Grand Cross of the Order of the Netherlands Lion (19 March 1980)
 Queen Sofía of Spain : Grand Cross of the Order of the Netherlands Lion (19 March 1980)
 Infanta Elena, Duchess of Lugo : Grand Cross of the Order of Orange-Nassau (8 October 1985)
 Infanta Cristina : Grand Cross of the Order of Orange-Nassau (8 October 1985)

Norway 

 Felipe VI of Spain : Knight Grand Cross of the Royal Norwegian Order of St. Olav (25 April 1995)
 Juan Carlos I of Spain : Knight Grand Cross with Collar of the Royal Norwegian Order of St. Olav (14 April 1982)
 Queen Sofía of Spain : Knight Grand Cross of the Royal Norwegian Order of St. Olav (14 April 1982)
 Infanta Elena, Duchess of Lugo : Knight Grand Cross of the Order of Saint Olav (25 April 1995)
 Infanta Cristina : Knight Grand Cross of the Order of Saint Olav (25 April 1995)

Poland 

 Felipe VI of Spain : Grand Cross of the Order of Merit of the Republic of Poland (26 September 2003)
 Juan Carlos I of Spain : Knight of the Order of the White Eagle (14 May 2001)
 Queen Sofía of Spain : Knight of the Order of the White Eagle (14 May 2001)

Portugal 

 Felipe VI of Spain : 
 Grand Cross of the Order of Christ (13/10/1988)
 Grand Cross of the Order of Aviz (22/04/1991)
 Grand Officer (23/08/1996) Grand Cross (25/09/2006) later Grand Collar (28/11/2016) of the Order of the Tower and Sword
 Grand Collar of the Order of Liberty (15/04/2018)
 Queen Letizia of Spain : 
 Grand Cross of the Order of Christ (25/09/2006)
 Grand Cross of the Order of Liberty (15/04/2018)
 Juan Carlos I of Spain :
 Grand Cross (20/05/1970) later Grand Collar (11/09/2000) of the Order of the Tower and Sword
 Knight Grand Collar of the Order of Prince Henry (17/04/1978)
 Grand Collar of the Order of Saint James of the Sword (11/10/1978)
 Grand Collar of the Order of Liberty (13/10/1988)
 Grand Cross of the Order of Christ (23/08/1996)
 Grand Cross of the Order of Aviz (18/06/2007)
 Queen Sofía of Spain :
 Grand Cross of the Order of Christ (17/04/1978)
 Grand Cross of the Order of Prince Henry (13/10/1988)
 Dame Grand Cross of the Order of St. James of the Sword (23/08/1996)
 Infanta Elena, Duchess of Lugo : 
 Grand Cross of the Order of Christ (13/10/1988)
 Grand Cross of the Order of Prince Henry (23/08/1996)
 Infanta Cristina : 
 Grand Cross of the Order of Christ (13/10/1988)
 Grand Cross of the Order of Prince Henry (23/08/1996)
 Infanta Margarita, Duchess of Soria and Hernani : Grand Cross of the Order of Prince Henry (13/10/1988)

Romania 
 Felipe VI of Spain : Grand Cross of the Order of the Star of Romania (26 November 2007)
 Queen Letizia of Spain : Grand Cross of the Order of Faithful Service (26 November 2007)
 Juan Carlos I of Spain : Sash (Collar) of the Order of the Star of Romania (2003)
 Queen Sofía of Spain : Grand Cross of the Order of the Star of Romania (2003)

Slovakia 
 Juan Carlos I of Spain : Grand Cross (or 1st Class) of the Order of the White Double Cross (2002)<
 Queen Sofía of Spain : Grand Cross (or 1st Class) of the Order of the White Double Cross (22 October 2007)

Sweden 

 Felipe VI of Spain : Knight later Collar of the Order of the Seraphim (17 December 1991) (24 November 2021)
 Queen Letizia of Spain :  Member of the Order of the Seraphim (24 November 2021)
 Juan Carlos I of Spain : Knight with Collar of the Order of the Seraphim (5 October 1979)
 Queen Sofía of Spain : Member of the Order of the Seraphim (5 October 1979)

United Kingdom 
 Felipe VI of Spain : 
 Stranger Knight of the Order of the Garter (12 July 2017)
 Honorary Knight Grand Cross of the Royal Victorian Order (17 October 1988)
 Juan Carlos I of Spain : 
 Stranger Knight of the Order of the Garter (974th member; 17 October 1988)
 Recipient of the Royal Victorian Chain (22 April 1986)

American foreign honours

Argentina 
 Felipe VI of Spain : Grand Cross of the Order of May (9 February 2009)
 Grand Cross later Collar of the Order of the Liberator General San Martín (22 February 2017)
 Queen Letizia of Spain : Grand Cross of the Order of the Liberator General San Martín (9 February 2009)
 Juan Carlos I of Spain : Collar of the Order of the Liberator General San Martín 
 Queen Sofía of Spain : Grand Cross of the Order of the Liberator General San Martín

Brazil 
 Felipe VI of Spain : Grand Cross of the Order of the Southern Cross
 Juan Carlos I of Spain : Collar of the Order of the Southern Cross (16 May 1991)
 Queen Sofía of Spain : Grand Cross of the Order of the Southern Cross (16 May 1991)

Chile 
 Felipe VI of Spain : 
 Grand Cross of the Order of Merit (4 June 2001)
 Collar of the Order of Merit (29 October 2014)
 Queen Letizia of Spain : Grand Cross of the Order of Merit (7 March 2011)
 Juan Carlos I of Spain : Collar of the Order of Merit (4 June 2001)
 Queen Sofía of Spain : Grand Cross of the Order of Merit (4 June 2001)
 Infanta Elena, Duchess of Lugo : Grand Cross of the Order of Merit (4 June 2001)

Colombia 
 Felipe VI of Spain : 
 Collar of the Order of Boyacá (2 March 2015)
 Queen Letizia of Spain : 
 Grand Cross of the Order of Boyacá (2 March 2015)
 Juan Carlos I of Spain : 
 Grand Cross of the Order of Boyacá (1976)
 Collar of the Order of San Carlos (1979)
 Queen Sofía of Spain : 
 Grand Cross of the Order of Boyacá (1976)
 Grand Cross of the Order of San Carlos (1979)

Costa Rica 
 Juan Carlos I of Spain : Grand Cross of the Order of Juan Mora Fernández (26 January 1993) 
 Queen Sofía of Spain : Grand Cross of the Order of Juan Mora Fernández (26 January 1993) (Photo)

Dominican Republic 
 Felipe VI of Spain : Grand Cross with Gold Breast Star of the Order of Christopher Columbus (24 April 1987)
 Juan Carlos I of Spain : Grand Cross with Gold Breast Star of the Order of Christopher Columbus (24 October 1969)
 Queen Sofía of Spain : Grand Cross with Gold Breast Star of the Order of Merit of Duarte, Sánchez and Mella (13 November 2000)

Ecuador 
 Felipe VI of Spain : Grand Cross of the National Order of San Lorenzo (9 July 2001)
 Juan Carlos I of Spain: Grand Collar of the National Order of San Lorenzo (13 May 1980)
 Queen Sofía of Spain : Grand Cross of the National Order of San Lorenzo (13 May 1980)
 Infanta Cristina: Grand Cross of the National Order of Merit (9 July 2001)

El Salvador 
 Felipe VI of Spain : Grand Cross with Silver Star of the Order of José Matías Delgado (10 March 1997)
 Juan Carlos I of Spain : Grand Cross with Golden Star of the Order of José Matías Delgado (14 September 1977)
 Queen Sofía of Spain : Grand Cross with Silver Star of the Order of José Matías Delgado (14 September 1977))
 Infanta Cristina : Grand Cross with Silver Star of the Order of José Matías Delgado (10 March 1997)

Guatemala 
 Juan Carlos I of Spain : Collar of the Order of the Quetzal (10 September 1977)
 Queen Sofía of Spain : Grand Cross of the Order of the Quetzal (10 September 1977)
 Infanta Elena, Duchess of Lugo : Grand Cross of the Order of the Quetzal (1 October 1986)
 Infanta Cristina : Grand Cross of the Order of the Quetzal (1 October 1986)

Honduras 
 Felipe VI of Spain : Grand Cross of the Order of Francisco Morazán (27 October 2018)
 Juan Carlos I of Spain : Grand Cross of the Order of Francisco Morazán(13 September 1977)
 Queen Sofía of Spain : Grand Cross of the Order of Francisco Morazán (13 September 1977)

Jamaica 
 Juan Carlos I of Spain : Member of the Order of Excellence (17 February 2009)
 Queen Sofía of Spain : Honorary Member of the Order of Jamaica (17 February 2009)

Mexico 
 Felipe VI of Spain : Sash (25 January 1996)  later Collar (29 June 2015) of the Order of the Aztec Eagle
 Queen Letizia of Spain : Sash  (11 June 2008)  later Sash of Special Category (29 June 2015) of the Order of the Aztec Eagle
 Juan Carlos I of Spain : Collar of the Order of the Aztec Eagle (8 October 1977)
 Queen Sofía of Spain : Sash of the Order of the Aztec Eagle (8 October 1977)
 Infanta Cristina : Sash of the Order of the Aztec Eagle (25 January 1996)

Panama 
 Felipe VI of Spain : Knight Grand Cross of the Order of Vasco Núñez de Balboa (19 October 1998)
 Queen Letizia of Spain : Knight Grand Cross of the Order of Vasco Núñez de Balboa (24 November 2008)
 Juan Carlos I of Spain : 
 Collar of the Order of Manuel Amador Guerrero (16 September 1977)
 Extraordinary Grand Cross of the Order of Vasco Núñez de Balboa (27 April 1979)
 Queen Sofía of Spain : Grand Cross of the Order of Vasco Núñez de Balboa (16 September 1977)

Peru 
 Felipe VI of Spain : Grand Cross of the Order of the Sun (5 July 2004)
 Grand Cross with Diamonds of the Order of the Sun (5 July 2015)
 Grand Cross of the ((Order of Merit for Distinguished Service)) (2018)
 Queen Letizia of Spain : Grand Cross of the Order of the Sun (5 July 2004)
 Grand Cross of the ((Order of Merit for Distinguished Service)) 
 Juan Carlos I of Spain : Grand Cross with Diamonds of the Order of the Sun (5 July 2004)
 Queen Sofía of Spain : Grand Cross of the Order of the Sun (5 July 2004)
 Infanta Elena, Duchess of Lugo : Grand Cross of the Order of the Sun (5 July 2004)
 Infanta Cristina : Grand Cross of the Order of the Sun (5 July 2004)

Venezuela 
 Juan Carlos I of Spain: Collar of the Order of the Liberator (8 September 1977)
 Queen Sofía of Spain: Grand Cordon of the Order of the Liberator (8 September 1977)

African foreign honours

Angola

 Felipe VI of Spain :  Recipient of the Order of Agostinho Neto (7 February 2023)
 Queen Letizia of Spain : Recipient of the Order of Agostinho Neto (7 February 2023)

Egypt 
 Juan Carlos I of Spain : Grand Cordon of the Order of the Nile (18 February 1997)
 Queen Sofía of Spain : Supreme Class of the Order of the Virtues (18 February 1997)
 Infanta Cristina : Supreme Class of the Order of the Virtues (29 May 2000)

Ethiopia 
 Juan Carlos I of Spain : Knight Grand Collar of the Imperial Order of Solomon
 Queen Sofía of Spain : Dame Grand Cross of the Order of the Queen of Sheba

Morocco 
 Felipe VI of Spain : Special Class of the Order of Muhammad (14 July 2014)
 Queen Letizia of Spain : Special Class of the Order of Muhammad (14 July 2014)
 Juan Carlos I of Spain : Special Class of the Order of Muhammad (25 September 1989)
 Queen Sofía of Spain : Special Class of the Order of Muhammad (18 September 2000)

Nigeria 
 Juan Carlos I of Spain : Grand Commander of the Order of the Niger (19 November 1991, GCON)
 Queen Sofía of Spain : Grand Commander of the Order of the Niger (19 November 1991, GCON)

Senegal 
 Juan Carlos I of Spain : Grand Cross of the Order of the Lion (13 November 1978)

South Africa 
 Juan Carlos I of Spain : Grand Cross of the Order of Good Hope (15 February 1999)
 Queen Sofía of Spain : Grand Cross of the Order of Good Hope (15 February 1999)

Democratic Republic of Congo (Zaire) 
(Former name of Democratic Republic of the Congo)
 Juan Carlos I of Spain : Grand Cordon of the National Order of the Leopard (1 December 1986)
 Queen Sofía of Spain : Grand Cordon of the National Order of the Leopard (1 December 1986)

Asian foreign honours

Middle East

Imperial State of Iran 
 Juan Carlos I of Spain :
Grand Collar of the Order of Pahlavi
Commemorative Medal of the 2500th Anniversary of the founding of the Persian Empire (14 October 1971)
 Queen Sofía of Spain : 
 Grand Cross (First Class -previously Second Class-) of the Order of the Pleiades or (Order of Haft Peikar)
Commemorative Medal of the 2500th Anniversary of the founding of the Persian Empire (14 October 1971)

Jordan 

 Felipe VI of Spain : Grand Cordon of the Supreme Order of the Renaissance (20 October 1999)
 Juan Carlos I of Spain : Collar of the Order of al-Hussein bin Ali (26 March 1985)
 Queen Sofía of Spain : 
 Grand Cordon of the Order of the Star of Jordan (26 March 1985)
 Grand Cordon of the Supreme Order of the Renaissance (20 October 1999)
 Infanta Elena, Duchess of Lugo : Grand Cordon of the Order of the Star of Jordan (20 October 1999)
 Jaime de Marichalar : Grand Cordon of the Order of Independence (20 October 1999)
 Infanta Cristina : Grand Cordon of the Order of the Star of Jordan (26 March 1985)

Kuwait
 Juan Carlos I of Spain : Collar of the Order of Mubarak the Great (2008)

Lebanon 

 Felipe VI of Spain :  Grand Cordon of the Order of Merit (19 October 2009)
 Queen Letizia of Spain : Grand Cordon of the Order of Merit (19 October 2009)
 Juan Carlos I of Spain : Extraordinary Grade of the Order of Merit (19 October 2009)
 Queen Sofía of Spain : Grand Cordon of the Order of Merit (19 October 2009)

Oman
 Juan Carlos I of Spain :  First Class military division of the Order of Oman (December 1985)

Saudi Arabia 
 Felipe VI of Spain : Collar of King Abdulaziz Order of Merit (2017)
 Juan Carlos I of Spain : Collar of King Abdulaziz Order of Merit (1981)

Far East

Japan 

 Felipe VI of Spain : Collar of the Order of the Chrysanthemum (5 April 2017)
 Queen Letizia of Spain : Grand Cordon (Paulownia) of the Order of the Precious Crown (5 April 2017)
 Juan Carlos I of Spain : Collar of the Order of the Chrysanthemum (28 October 1980)
 Queen Sofía of Spain : Grand Cordon (Paulownia) of the Order of the Precious Crown (28 October 1980)
 Infanta Elena, Duchess of Lugo : Grand Cordon (Paulownia) of the Order of the Precious Crown (10 October 1994)
 Infanta Cristina : Grand Cordon (Paulownia) of the Order of the Precious Crown (10 October 1994)

Kingdom of Nepal 

 Juan Carlos I of Spain : Member of the Order of Nepal Pratap Bhaskara (Nepal Decoration of Honour) (19 September 1983)
 Queen Sofía of Spain : Member of the Order of Ojaswi Rajanya (Benevolent Ruler) (19 September 1983)
 Infanta Elena, Duchess of Lugo : Member First Class of the Order of Tri Shakti Patta (Three Divine Powers) (19 September 1983)
 Infanta Cristina : Member First Class of the Order of Tri Shakti Patta (Three Divine Powers) (19 September 1983)

Philippines 

 Felipe VI of Spain : 
 Grand Cross (Datu) of the Order of Sikatuna (2 April 1995) 
 Grand Cross (Bayani) of the Order of Lakandula (3 December 2007)
 Queen Letizia of Spain : Grand Cross (Maringal na Krus) of the Order of the Golden Heart (3 December 2007)
 Juan Carlos I of Spain : 
 Grand Collar (Raja) of the Order of Sikatuna (18 February 1974)
 Grand Collar (Supremo) of the Order of Lakandula (3 December 2007)
 Queen Sofía of Spain : 
 Order of Gabriela Silang (2 April 1995)
 Grand Collar (Maringal na Kuwintas) of the Order of the Golden Heart (3 December 2007)

South Korea 

 Felipe VI of Spain : Grand Gwanghwa Medal of the Order of Diplomatic Service Merit (12 February 2007)
  Member of the Grand Order of Mugunghwa (15 June 2021)
 Queen Letizia of Spain : Grand Gwanghwa Medal of the Order of Diplomatic Service Merit (15 June 2021)
 Juan Carlos I of Spain : Member of the Grand Order of Mugunghwa (1996)
 Queen Sofía of Spain : Member of the Grand Order of Mugunghwa (1996)

Thailand 

 Juan Carlos I of Spain : Knight of the Order of the Rajamitrabhorn (19 November 1987)
 Knight of the Order of the Royal House of Chakri (22 February 2006)
 Queen Sofía of Spain : 
 Dame Grand Cross (First Class) of the Order of Chula Chom Klao (19 November 1987)
 Dame of the Order of the Royal House of Chakri (22 February 2006)
 Infanta Cristina : Dame Grand Cordon (Special Class) of the Order of the White Elephant (19 November 1987)

See also 
List of titles and honours of the Spanish Crown
List of titles and honours of King Felipe VI of Spain
 List of titles and honours of Queen Letizia of Spain
List of titles and honours of King Juan Carlos I of Spain
List of titles and honours of Sofía, Queen of Spain

References

Orders, decorations, and medals of Spain
Spain